Bethan Benwell (born 4 August 1971), is a British linguist. She has been a senior lecturer in English Language and Linguistics, for the Division of Literature and Languages, at the University of Stirling since 2008.

She was co-investigator on an AHRC-funded project (2007–2010): Devolving Diasporas: Migration and Reception in Central Scotland, 1980–present with James Procter (Newcastle University), Gemma Robinson (University of Stirling), and Jackie Kay (Newcastle University).

Her book, Discourse and Identity, which was co-authored with Elizabeth Stokoe, was nominated for the British Association for Applied Linguistics (BAAL) Book Prize in 2007.

Bibliography

Books

Chapters in books 
  Online.

Journal articles 
 
 
 
 
 
 
  Pdf.
 
 
  Pdf.

Book reviews

References

External links 
 Profile page: Bethan Benwell, English Studies, Literature and Languages, University of Stirling
 Devolving Diasporas project

1971 births
Academics of the University of Stirling
Linguists from the United Kingdom
British mass media scholars
Living people
Sociolinguists
Place of birth missing (living people)